Presley may refer to:

Presley (also variants Pressley and Pressly), a surname and given name
Presley Branch, a stream in the U.S. states of Arkansas and Missouri
USS Presley (DE-371), was a John C. Butler-class destroyer escort acquired by the U.S. Navy during World War II
Presley, a pet male Spix's macaw that was repatriated to Brazil from the United States in 2002